Hippolyte Bayard (20 January 1801 – 14 May 1887) was a French photographer and pioneer in the history of photography.  He invented his own process that produced direct positive paper prints in the camera and presented the world's first public exhibition of photographs on 24 June 1839.  He claimed to have invented photography earlier than Louis-Jacques Mandé Daguerre in France and William Henry Fox Talbot in England, the men traditionally credited with its invention.

Bayard experimented with the new medium taking photos of plant specimens, statuary (including posing with them for self-portraits), street scenes, urban landscapes, architectural photos, and portraits. He photographed prominent figures and an ordinary worker. He also advocated combination printing and was one of the founders of a photo society.

Early life and career
While working as a civil servant, Bayard experimented with photography.  He developed his own method of producing photos called the direct positive process.  It involved exposing silver chloride paper to light, which turned the paper completely black. It was then soaked in potassium iodide before being exposed in a camera. After the exposure, it was washed in a bath of hyposulfite of soda and dried.

The resulting image was a unique photograph that could not be reproduced. Because of the paper's poor light sensitivity, an exposure of about twelve minutes was required, so that still-lives were favoured and human sitters were told to close their eyes to eliminate the eerie, "dead" quality produced by blinking and moving the eyes during a long exposure.

In the summer of 1851, along with photographers Édouard Baldus, Henri Le Secq, Gustave Le Gray, and O. Mestral, Bayard travelled throughout France to photograph architectural monuments at the request of the Commission des Monuments Historiques.

Self Portrait as a Drowned Man

Bayard was persuaded to postpone announcing his process to the French Academy of Sciences by François Arago, a friend of Louis Daguerre, who invented the rival daguerreotype process. Arago's conflict of interest cost Bayard his recognition as one of the principal inventors of photography. He eventually gave details of the process to the French Academy of Sciences on 24 February 1840, in return for money to buy better equipment.

In reaction to the injustice that he felt he had been subjected to, Bayard made, possibly in October 1840,  the first staged photograph, Self Portrait as a Drowned Man, in which he pretends to have committed suicide, sitting and leaning to the right. Bayard wrote on the back of his most notable photograph:

Late career
Despite his initial hardships in photography, Bayard continued to be a productive member of the photographic society. He was a founding member of the French Society of Photography. Bayard was also one of the first photographers to be commissioned to document and preserve architecture and historical sites in France for the Missions Héliographiques in 1851 by the Historic Monument Commission. He used a paper photographic process similar to the one he developed to take pictures for the Commission. Additionally, he suggested combining two negatives to properly expose the sky and then the landscape or building, an idea known as combination printing which began being used in the 1850s.

Famous photographs

 Self Portrait as a Drowned Man, 1840.
 Specimens, 1842.
 Construction Worker, Paris, 1845–1847.
 Self Portrait in the Garden, 1847.

Gallery

See also
 Bayard Islands

References

Gautrand, Jean-Claude and Frizot, Michel, Hippolyte Bayard. Naissance de l'image photographique, Éd. Trois cailloux, 1986.
Keeler, Nancy, "Hippolyte Bayard aux origines de la photographie et de la ville moderne", in: La Recherche photographique Nr. 2, Univ. Paris VIII, May 1987.
Lavin, Amélie, Hippolyte Bayard. Fictions photographiques: effet d'image et jeu idéal, DEA Thesis, Univ. Paris I, 2001.
Poivert, Michel & Lavin, Amélie, Hippolyte Bayard, Photopoche Nr. 91, Paris: Nathan 2001.
Rosen, Margit, Hippolyte Bayard. Fotografie und die Fiktion des Todes, MA Thesis, Staatliche Hochschule für Gestaltung Karlsruhe (HfG), 2002.
Hippolyte Bayard: chevalier de l'ombre (Proceedings of the colloquy in Breteuil-sur-Noye, 16–17 November 2001), Breteuil-sur-Noye: Société historique de Breteuil-sur-Noye, 2005.
Lerner, Jillian, "The Drowned Inventor: Bayard, Daguerre, and the Curious Attractions of Early Photography" History of Photography 38.3 (2014) http://www.tandfonline.com/eprint/YhBxjaWf7hNBxVYmNGNn/full

External links
Hippolyte Bayard and Photogenic Drawing
Hippolyte Bayard (Getty Museum)
Hippolyte Bayard (Metropolitan Museum of Art)

1807 births
1887 deaths
Pioneers of photography
19th-century French photographers